The men's marathon event at the 1999 Pan American Games was held on July 25.

Results

References

Athletics at the 1999 Pan American Games
1999
Panamerican
1999 Panamerican
1999 Panamerican Games